DWQL (91.1 FM), on-air as Barangay LS 91.1, is a radio station owned and operated by GMA Network in the Philippines. The station's studio and transmitter are located along Merchant St., Lucena.

Two of the station's alumni are Erwin David, known as Papa Kiko, and Papa Piolo, now known as Papa Dudut of the flagship station Barangay LS 97.1 in Manila.

References

External links
Barangay LS 91.1 Lucena Facebook Page

Radio stations in Lucena, Philippines
Radio stations established in 1998
Barangay FM stations
1998 establishments in the Philippines